The Academy of Music is a historic theatre building located in Lynchburg, Virginia.  The three story theater was built 1904–05 in the Beaux Arts style with a Neoclassical interior. It was designed by Frye & Chesterman. It is one of the only surviving legitimate theaters of the turn-of-the-century period in Virginia. Some of the more notable European and American names to appear on its stage included Ignace Paderewski, Anna Pavlova, Sarah Bernhardt, Alma Gluck, DeWolf Hopper, Otis Skinner, John Drew and Mrs. Patrick Campbell. In 2008, the Lynchburg Academy of Fine Arts received a $245,000 earmark from Representative Bob Goodlatte from the Community Development Fund of the United States Department of Housing and Urban Development, for renovations to the building.

It was listed on the National Register of Historic Places in 1969.

References

External links

 Lynchburg Online website
Academy of Music, Main & Sixth Streets, Lynchburg, VA: 1 photo, 1 data page, and 1 photo caption page, at Historic American Buildings Survey

Historic American Buildings Survey in Virginia
Theatres on the National Register of Historic Places in Virginia
Theatres completed in 1904
Beaux-Arts architecture in Virginia
Buildings and structures in Lynchburg, Virginia
National Register of Historic Places in Lynchburg, Virginia